Six Feet Under is an American death metal band from Tampa, Florida. They have released thirteen studio albums, four cover albums, one live album, four video albums, two EPs and fourteen music videos.

Studio albums

Cover albums

Live albums

Video albums

Extended plays

Music videos

References

Discographies of American artists
Heavy metal group discographies